Kristall Ice Sports Palace is an indoor sporting arena that is located in Saratov, Russia. The arena was originally built in 1969, and was renovated in 2014. The seating capacity of the arena is 6,100.

History
It has been used as the home arena of the Russian ice hockey team Kristall Saratov of the Russian 2nd Division. It is also the home arena of the Russian basketball team Avtodor Saratov, of the VTB United League.

References

External links
Venue information

Basketball venues in Russia
Indoor arenas in Russia
Indoor ice hockey venues in Russia